Ubarana is a municipality in the state of São Paulo in Brazil.

References

municipalities in São Paulo (state)